The United States sent a delegation to compete at the 1964 Summer Paralympics in Tokyo, Japan.  Its athletes finished first in the gold and overall medal count.

See also 
 1964 Summer Paralympics
 United States at the 1964 Summer Olympics

References

External links
International Paralympic Committee Official Website
United States Paralympic Committee Official Website

Nations at the 1964 Summer Paralympics
1964
Summer Paralympics